The 2010 Tampa Bay Buccaneers season was the franchise's 35th season in the National Football League and the second under head coach Raheem Morris. The Buccaneers entered the season attempting to improve on their 3–13 record and last place finish in the NFC South in 2009, a feat they accomplished after only six games.  The Buccaneers achieved the best turnaround in franchise history and became the first team since the NFL merger in 1970 to start 10 rookies and achieve a winning season. Raheem Morris spent his second season as head coach. The Buccaneers had the third overall pick in the 2010 NFL Draft, with which they selected Gerald McCoy.

John McKay, the team's first head coach, became the second inductee into the Ring of Honor on December 5 during a game against Atlanta. McKay's son Rich, a former Buccaneers general manager, and current president of the Falcons, accepted the award for his late father. The Buccaneers wore throwback uniforms for the Falcons game.

Despite finishing the season with a 10–6 record (a seven-game improvement from the year before), the team failed to sell out any of its home games at Raymond James Stadium, and narrowly missed the playoffs. It is the second NFL stadium that failed to sell out any of the team's home games; the first stadium was Sun Devil Stadium back in 2005. This was the team's last winning season until the 2016 season.

Schedule

Preseason
The Buccaneers preseason schedule was announced on March 31, 2010.

Regular season
The Buccaneers' schedule was announced on April 20, 2010.

COLOR KEY & NOTES:

Bold indicates division games.
 Orange indicates designated throwback uniform game.
 Gray indicates that the game was blacked out locally due to low ticket sales.

Standings

Game summaries

Week 1: vs. Cleveland Browns

The Tampa Bay Buccaneers began the 2010 season against the Browns. In the first quarter, Jake Delhomme completed a 41-yard touchdown pass to Mohamed Massaquoi for a 7–0 lead. Buccaneers kicker Connor Barth made a 49-yard field goal to trim the deficit to 7–3. In the second quarter, the Browns increased their lead with a Peyton Hillis touchdown run. Josh Freeman completed a 3-yard touchdown pass to Mike Williams for a 14–10 halftime score.

The Buccaneers took the lead in the fourth quarter with Freeman's second touchdown pass, this time to Micheal Spurlock. The Buccaneers held the Browns scoreless in the second half and won their first opening day game since 2005.

Week 2: at Carolina Panthers

The Buccaneers took a 7–0 lead after a 14-yard touchdown pass from Josh Freeman to Earnest Graham. Carolina tied answered with Matt Moore completing a 37-yard touchdown pass to  Steve Smith. Tampa Bay scored a 35-yard touchdown pass to Mike Williams to take a 14–7 lead into half time. Connor Barth scored two field goals in the second half, and Tampa Bay won 20–7.

The Buccaneers defense dominated Carolina, holding Jonathan Stewart and DeAngelo Williams to 43 and 54 yards rushing, respectively. Matt Moore completed only 6 of 16 passes with one interception, while being sacked four times. Moore was benched in favor of rookie Jimmy Clausen, who was unable to rally the Panthers. Josh Freeman passed for 178 yards and two touchdowns.
With the win, Tampa Bay improved to 2–0.

Week 3: vs. Pittsburgh Steelers

Tampa Bay took an early 3–0 lead with Connor Barth's 40-yard field goal. However, Pittsburgh dominated the remainder of the game. Mike Wallace caught two touchdown passes of 46 yards and 41 yards, respectively. The Steelers rushed for 201 yards, and routed Tampa Bay 38–13.

Week 5: at Cincinnati Bengals

Coming out of their bye week, the Buccaneers traveled to Cincinnati to face the Bengals. The Bengals took an early 7–0 lead after Carson Palmer threw a 43-yard touchdown pass to Terrell Owens. At the end the first quarter, the Buccaneers pinned the Bengals back at their own 6-yard line. One the first play of the second quarter, Cody Grimm intercepted Palmer, and returned the ball 11 yards for a touchdown for a 7–7 tie. A Mike Nugent 31-yard field goal gave the Bengals a 10–7 halftime lead.

In the third quarter, Tampa Bay drove 80 yards for their second touchdown, and a 14–10 lead. the Bengals replied with a field goal, to trim their deficit to 14–13. Micheal Spurlock fumbled the ensuing kickoff, and the Bengals recovered deep in Tampa Bay territory.

In the fourth quarter, the Bengals capitalized on the turnover. Palmer found Jermaine Gresham for a 1-yard touchdown pass (along with a successful Cedric Benson 2-point conversion run) to take a 21–14 lead. The teams traded possession twice, and with 2:28 remaining, the Bengals faced 3rd down & 8 at their own 43-yard line. Tampa Bay had no timeouts, and a first down would secure the win for Cincinnati. Palmer was intercepted by Aqib Talib at the 50-yard line. Five plays later, Josh Freeman completed a 20-yard touchdown pass to Mike Williams. With 25 second left, the Buccaneers again intercepted Palmer. Sabby Piscitelli returned the ball to the Cincinnati 34-yard line. With 5 seconds left in regulation, Connor Barth made a 31-yard field goal to win the game 24–21.

Week 6: vs. New Orleans Saints

Tampa Bay trailed early after Drew Brees completed touchdown passes of 41 yards and 42 yards to Lance Moore and Robert Meachem. New Orleans led Tampa Bay 24–0 at the end of the third quarter. Tampa Bay scored in the fourth quarter with Josh Freeman completing 2-yard touchdown pass to Micheal Spurlock, and avoided a shutout.

Week 7: vs. St. Louis Rams

Tampa Bay took the lead 3–0 as kicker Connor Barth made a 35-yard field goal. The Rams, however, scored 17 unanswered points in the second quarter. Josh Brown made a 25-yard field goal. The next two Rams drives saw two Sam Bradford touchdown passes to Danny Amendola and Michael Hoomanawanui, respectively. Barth nailed a 39-yard field goal at the end of the second quarter, and the Rams took a 17–6 lead into halftime.

The Buccaneers offense continued to sputter in the second half. Barth connected on two more field goals (53 yards and 38 yards) to trim the score to 17–12. The Tampa Bay defense held the Rams scoreless in the third quarter.

With 4:45 remaining in the fourth quarter, the Buccaneer offense finally broke through. Josh Freeman led the team on a 16-play, 81-yard drive, capped off by a 1-yard touchdown pass to "Cadillac" Williams with 10 seconds left in the game. A failed two-point conversion followed, but the Buccaneers held on to win 18–17.

Jerramy Stevens was left inactive for the game, following a drug-related arrest the night before the game. A day later, Stevens was released.

Week 8: at Arizona Cardinals

The Buccaneers won their fifth straight road game (dating back to the previous season) with a shootout win against the Cardinals.

Arizona took the early lead after a 3-yard touchdown pass from Max Hall to Larry Fitzgerald. On their next drive, Geno Hayes intercepted Hall, and returned 41-yards for a touchdown. Early in the second quarter, Buccaneers returner Sammie Stroughter muffed a punt and the ball was recovered by the Cardinals at the Tampa Bay 16-yard line. Beanie Wells scored a 1-yard touchdown run off the turnover, and the Cardinals led 14–7. On the ensuing drive, Josh Freeman drove the Buccaneers 80 yards in only three plays, completing a 47-yard touchdown pass to Mike Williams and a 14–14 tie. Four plays later, Aqib Talib returned Hall's second interception 45 yards for a touchdown and the Buccaneers led 21–14. Hall was benched in favor of Derek Anderson. Anderson drove the Cardinals to the Tampa Bay 3-yard line, but threw incomplete on a 4th down & 2 and turned the ball over on downs. Tampa Bay drove 94 yards in the final three minutes, and Connor Barth kicked a field goal as the half expired.

In the third quarter, Tampa Bay increased their lead to 31–14 after a LeGarrette Blount touchdown run. Arizona rallied, however. LaRod Stephens-Howling rushed for a 30-yard touchdown with one minute left in the third quarter. Blount fumbled the ball on the first play of the ensuing drive, and Gerald Hayes recovered the ball 21 yards for a Cardinals touchdown.

With 9:46 left in the game, Arizona took the lead 35–31 following Anderson's 5-yard touchdown pass to Fitzgerald. Tampa Bay answered with Blount's second touchdown run, and a 38–35 lead. Barrett Ruud intercepted Anderson on the first play of the next drive, which set up a 53-yard field goal attempt by Barth. Tampa Bay chose to attempt the long field goal instead of punting. The kick was blocked, and the Cardinals took over with 3:16 remaining in good field position. Anderson drove the Cardinals to the Tampa Bay 20-yard line, but he was intercepted by Aqib Talib, who clinched the win for Tampa Bay.

Week 9: at Atlanta Falcons

Michael Turner rushed for 107 yards and two touchdowns, as the Falcons held off the Buccaneers 27–21 in an NFC South division rivalry game. The Falcons took an early 14–0 lead after Turner's two touchdown runs of 2 and 10 yards. Micheal Spurlock took the next kickoff return 66 yards to the Atlanta 32-yard line, which set up Tampa Bay's first score. Josh Freeman completed a 14-yard touchdown pass to Arrelious Benn to make the score 14–7. Atlanta drove to the Tampa Bay 13, and Matt Bryant made a 31-yard field goal to increase the lead to 17–7. With two minutes remaining in the half, Freeman found Mike Williams for a 58-yard touchdown pass, and a 17–14 halftime score.

On the first drive of the third quarter, Freeman was intercepted by Jonathan Babineaux at the Tampa Bay 30-yard line. Matt Ryan threw a 5-yard touchdown pass to Michael Palmer. After another field goal Atlanta led 27–14. On the ensuing kickoff, Maurice Stovall bobbled the ball, and Micheal Spurlock scooped it up at the 11-yard line. Spurlock avoided tackles, and tightroped down the sideline for an 89-yard kickoff return touchdown.

Trailing 27–21 with 2:44 remaining, Freeman had driven the Buccaneers 89 yards in 12 plays to the Atlanta 2-yard line. Facing 4th down & 1 at the Atlanta 2, LeGarrette Blount was tackled for no gain, and held at the line of scrimmage, which turned the ball over on downs. Atlanta remained undefeated at home, winning 27–21.

Week 10: vs. Carolina Panthers

Hoping to rebound from their loss to the Falcons the Buccaneers played on home ground for an NFC South rivalry match against the Panthers. In the 1st quarter the Buccaneers took the lead as QB Josh Freeman made an 8-yard TD pass to WR Arrelious Benn. The Panthers narrowed the lead with kicker John Kasay hitting a 46-yard field goal. The Buccaneers increased their lead in the second quarter with RB LeGarrette Blount getting a 17-yard TD run; but the Panthers replied with RB Josh Vaughan making a 2-yard TD run. Tampa Bay scored again when Freeman found TE Kellen Winslow on a 20-yard TD pass. The lead was narrowed with Kasay's 28 and 48-yard field goals, but the Buccaneers pulled away in the fourth quarter with kicker Connor Barth nailing a 32-yard field goal, and with RB Cadillac Williams getting a 45-yard TD run.

With the win, Tampa Bay not only improved to 6–3, but achieved a season sweep over the Carolina Panthers.

Week 11: at San Francisco 49ers

Tampa Bay sacked Troy Smith six times, forced two turnovers, and held the 49ers to only 189 total yards of offense, in a shutout win by the score of 21–0. It was the Buccaneers first win at San Francisco since 1980, and the 49ers first home shutout since 1977.

Early in the second quarter, Tampa Bay drove 80 yards in 14 plays, culminating in a 6-yard touchdown run by Cadillac Williams. Tampa Bay took a 7–0 lead into halftime.

With 3:36 remaining in the third quarter, Josh Freeman completed a pass 33 yards to Mike Williams to the San Francisco 33-yard line. Four plays later, Freeman completed to Williams for an 8-yard touchdown pass, and a 14–0 lead. The Tampa Bay defense forced a turnover on downs, and on San Francisco's next possession, Ronde Barber intercepted Troy Smith. The turnover led to Tampa Bay's third touchdown, a 1-yard pass to offensive tackle Donald Penn.

With the shut out win, Tampa Bay improved to 7–3

Wide receiver Mike Williams was arrested two days before the game for DUI charges, but was released on bail and played in the game.

Week 12: at Baltimore Ravens

The Buccaneers traveled to M&T Bank Stadium to face the Baltimore Ravens. In a largely defensive game, the teams traded field goals in the second quarter. The game was tied 3–3 with 4:32 remaining in the first half. Quarterback Joe Flacco struck quickly, however, completing touchdown passes of 65 yards and 10 yards, to Todd Heap and Derrick Mason respectively, just before half time.

Trailing 17–3 with about three minutes left in the game, Josh Freeman completed a 5-yard touchdown pass to Kellen Winslow. The Buccaneers were unable to get the ball back on offense, and fell by a score of 17–10.

Week 13: vs. Atlanta Falcons

The Buccaneers hosted division rival Atlanta, wearing their orange throwback uniforms. Tied 7–7 in the second quarter, Matt Ryan completed a 17-yard touchdown pass to Ovie Mughelli and a 14–7 Atlanta lead. With two minutes left in the first half, Ryan was intercepted by Sean Jones. With 15 seconds left in the half, Josh Freeman threw a touchdown pass to Mike Williams, to tie the score at 14–14.

Connor Barth kicked a 33-yard field goal, and Tampa Bay took a 17–14 lead in the third quarter. With 12:33 left in the game, Corey Lynch intercepted Matt Ryan. The turnover led to a 2-yard touchdown pass to John Gilmore, and Tampa Bay led 24–14 with 10:24 remaining.

Eric Weems returned the ensuing kickoff 102 yards for a touchdown. That trimmed the lead to 24–21. On Atlanta's next drive, Ronde Barber was called for pass interference, and Quincy Black was penalized for a "horse-collar tackle." Atlanta quickly scored a 9-yard touchdown pass to Michael Jenkins, and took a 28–24 lead with 4:31 left.

Josh Freeman led Tampa Bay on a hopeful go-ahead drive. Facing 4th down and 12 at the Atlanta 46-yard line, Freeman completed a 19-yard pass to Sammie Stroughter to keep the drive alive. On the next play, however, Freeman was intercepted by Brent Grimes at the 19-yard line, securing the victory for Atlanta.

Week 14: at Washington Redskins

Tampa Bay faced Washington, on a cold, rainy afternoon. The wet conditions saw Redskins kicker Graham Gano miss two field goals early. One hit the upright, and the second sailed wide left. Despite Ryan Torain already having rushed for 133 yards to that point, the score still remained 0–0.

On the Buccaneers next possession, LeGarrette Blount fumbled away the ball, which led to a Washington score. Donovan McNabb completed a touchdown pass to Logan Paulsen, and the Redskins took the lead 7–0. On the next play, Josh Freeman completed a 64-yard pass to Arrelious Benn, which led to a field goal, and the game went to halftime with Washington leading 10–3.

Connor Barth scored field goals on Tampa Bay's first two possessions of the second half. At the end of the third quarter, Washington clung to a 10–9 lead.

In the fourth quarter, Freeman drove the Buccaneers 79 yards to the Washington 1-yard line. After a 43-yard pass to Benn, which gave them 1st & Goal at the 1-yard line, Freeman fumbled away the ball and Washington recovered. However, Washington failed to score on their next two drives. With less than 4 minutes left, Tampa Bay took the lead 17–10 when Freeman threw a touchdown pass to Kellen Winslow II, then rushed in himself for the two-point conversion.

In the final minutes, Donovan McNabb drove the Redskins 75 yards for a potential game-tying score. McNabb threw a touchdown pass to Santana Moss with 9 seconds left in regulation. On the extra point try, the snap sailed over the head of holder Hunter Smith, and the attempt failed, giving the Buccaneers the victory by a score of 17–16.

Week 15: vs. Detroit Lions

Tampa Bay trailed Detroit 7–0 after the first quarter. The Buccaneers rallied in the second quarter, as Josh Freeman completed a 24-yard touchdown pass to Mike Williams, followed by 39-yard touchdown run by LeGarrette Blount.

In the fourth quarter, Tampa Bay trailed 17–14. Freeman drove the Buccaneers to the Detroit 1-yard line. Kellen Winslow caught a touchdown pass, but it was nullified by an offensive pass interference penalty, and the Buccaneers settled for a field goal and a 17–17 tie. Tampa Bay took a 20–17 lead with 1:44 remaining in regulation. However, Detroit drove down the field, and Dave Rayner kicked a field goal for Detroit, and tied the game as time expired. Detroit won the coin toss in overtime, and Rayner kicked the game-winning field goal on the first possession.

Had the Buccaneers won (or tied) this game, they would have qualified for the playoffs and denied the eventual Super Bowl XLV champion Green Bay Packers a postseason berth.

Week 16: vs. Seattle Seahawks

Josh Freeman threw for 237 yards and threw five touchdown passes, tying a franchise record, as Tampa Bay routed Seattle 38–15.

In the first quarter, Matt Hasselbeck scrambled for a 1-yard touchdown to give Seattle a 7–0 lead. However, Hasselbeck suffered a muscle strain on the play, and was sidelined for the remainder of the game. Backup quarterback Charlie Whitehurst was forced to take over for Seattle.

Micheal Spurlock returned the ensuing kickoff 79 yards to the Seattle 17-yard line, setting up a Connor Barth field goal. Tampa Bay scored 31 unanswered points, including two touchdown passes apiece from Freeman to Kellen Winslow and Mike Williams.

Week 17: at New Orleans Saints

Looking to secure a playoff spot, the Buccaneers played at New Orleans. Trailing 3–7 in the second quarter, the Buccaneers took the lead with Josh Freeman completing a 2-yard touchdown pass to Dezmon Briscoe. The Saints tied the game after Garrett Hartley's 45-yard field goal in the third quarter. Tampa Bay re-took the lead after another field goal, then stretched their lead with Freeman's second touchdown pass of the day. The Saints tried to narrow the gap with Hartley making a 38-yard field goal, but the Buccaneers held on to win.

With the win, the Buccaneers finished with a 10–6 record, but the Green Bay Packers victory over the Chicago Bears later that day gave them the 6th seed due to a strength of victory tie-breaker and eliminated the Buccaneers from playoff contention.
This was also tied with the Giants but were eliminated because of Green Bay's tie breaker with them and the Giants.

Off-season

Personnel changes 
 Alex Van Pelt joined the team as quarterbacks coach, taking the role over from Greg Olson so that he could concentrate on the offensive coordinator role.
 Eric Yarber joined the team as wide receivers coach, taking the role over from Richard Mann who left the team.
 Robert Nunn left the team leaving Todd Wash with the sole responsibility for the defensive line.
 Joe Baker moved from defensive backs coach to linebackers, taking the role over from Joe Barry who left the team.
 Jimmy Lake became defensive backs coach.
 Tim Holt joined the team as an offensive assistant coach.
 Chris Mosley became a defensive assistant coach, moving from the position of assistant offensive line coach.

Roster changes

Free agents 
 Brian Clark WR – UFA – Signed with Detroit Lions in free agency
 Antonio Bryant WR – UFA – Signed with Cincinnati Bengals in free agency
 Matt McCoy OLB – UFA – Signed with Seattle Seahawks in free agency
 Will Allen FS – UFA – Signed with Pittsburgh Steelers in free agency
 Angelo Crowell OLB – UFA – Re-signed with Buccaneers
 Jermaine Phillips SS – UFA
 Jimmy Wilkerson DE – UFA – Signed with New Orleans Saints in free agency
 Donald Penn OT – RFA – Tendered 1st and 3rd – Resigned on first morning of training camp to 5-year deal.
 Barrett Ruud ILB – RFA – Tendered 1st and 3rd – Re-signed with Buccaneers
 Carnell Williams RB – RFA – Tendered 1st – Re-signed with Buccaneers
 Jeremy Trueblood OT – RFA – Tendered 2nd – Re-signed with Buccaneers
 Mark Bradley WR – RFA – Tendered 2nd – Re-signed with Buccaneers
 Maurice Stovall WR – RFA – Tendered 3rd – Re-signed with Buccaneers
 Rod Wilson OLB – Untendered RFA – Signed with the Jacksonville Jaguars on 17 August
 Byron Storer FB – Untendered RFA – Taken place on Buccaneers coaching staff as assistant special teams coach, forced to retire due to injuries
 Clifton Smith RB – ERFA – Re-signed with Buccaneers
 Elbert Mack CB – ERFA – Re-signed with Buccaneers

Releases 

 Clifton Smith RB
 Derrick Ward RB
 B. J. Askew FB
 Mark Bradley WR
 Reggie Brown WR
 Michael Clayton WR
 Terrence Nunn WR
 Mario Urrutia WR
 Martin Rucker TE – Failed physical, released day after he signed
 Marc Dile OT

 Xavier Fulton OT
 Shawn Murphy G
 Arron Sears G
 Donovan Raiola C
 Chris Hovan DT
 Dre Moore DT
 Maurice Evans DE
 Carlton Powell DE
 Angelo Crowell OLB
 Lee Robinson OLB

 Brandon Anderson CB
 Torrie Cox CB
 Derrick Roberson CB
 Trae Williams CB
 Stoney Woodson CB
 Emanuel Cook SS
 De'von Hall FS
 Josh Bidwell P
 Dirk Johnson P
 Sam Paulescu P

Signings 

 Sean Jones SS
 Jon Alston OLB
 Keydrick Vincent G

 Kregg Lumpkin RB
 Ted Larsen C/G
 Carlton Powell DE

 Donovan Raiola C
 Martin Rucker TE
 Trae Williams CB

Trades
 Reggie Brown WR – Traded from the Philadelphia Eagles for a 6th round pick in 2011 draft

Cut during season
 Jerramy Stevens TE – Cut on October 25 after he was arrested for possession of cannabis with intent to sell.
 Keydrick Vincent
 Sabby Piscitelli
 Ryan Sims
 Chris Pressley

2010 Draft class 

After finishing the 2009 season with a record of 3–13, the Buccaneers picked third. The Buccaneers also had an additional second round pick from a trade that sent the late defensive end Gaines Adams to the Chicago Bears, a fifth round pick from the New England Patriots in a trade that sent tight end Alex Smith to the Patriots, and two additional seventh round picks; one from the Jacksonville Jaguars for quarterback Luke McCown, and one from the Baltimore Ravens for defensive end Marques Douglas. The Buccaneers traded their 2010 fifth-round selection and a 2009 second-round selection to the Browns for TE Kellen Winslow II.

Undrafted free agents 
After the draft many of the players that went unpicked are signed by teams to fill out their rosters and create competition for places on the roster. These undrafted free agents have a long shot of making the team for the start of the regular season but there have been some notable recent Buccaneer success stories such as Clifton Smith and Elbert Mack. The following were signed after the draft as first year players.

 Jevan Snead QB – Released
 Carlos Brown RB – Released
 LeGarrette Blount RB – Claimed off waivers after roster cuts, on 53 man roster
 Rendrick Taylor FB – Released
 Damola adeniji wr – Released
 Shawn moore wr – Released
 Dezmon Briscoe WR – Practice squad
 Chris Brooks WR – Released
 Preston Parker WR – Made initial 53 man roster
 Jeron Mastrud TE – Released
 Will Barker OT – Practice Squad
 Derek Hardman OT – Practice Squad
 Rob okeafor ot – Released
 James williams ot – Released
 Lee grimes og – Released
 Sergio Render OG – Released
 Vladimir Richard OG – Released
 Michael shumard og – Released
 Jeff Tow-Arnett C – Released
 Matt featherston de – Released
 Brandon gilbeaux de – Placed on Injury Reserve
 George Johnson DE – Practice Squad
 James Ruffin DE – Released
 Rico McCoy OLB – Released
 Darrell pasco cb – Released
 Dennis rogan fs – Released
 Matt O'Hanlon SS – Waived due to injury
 Vince Anderson SS – Released
 Hunter Lawrence K – Released
 Chris Bryan P – Claimed off waivers after roster cuts, on 53 man roster
 Chris mauriello ls – Released

Staff

Final roster

Awards
 Week 5: Josh Freeman – NFC Offensive Player of the Week
 Week 8: Aqib Talib – NFC Defensive Player of the Week
 Week 16: Josh Freeman – FedEx Air Player of the Week
 Week 16: LeGarrette Blount – FedEx Ground Player of the Week
 Week 17: Josh Freeman – FedEx Air Player of the Week
 Week 17: Josh Freeman – NFC Offensive Player of the Week
 NFL Rookie of the Month For December:  LeGarrette Blount

Television blackouts
All of the Tampa Bay Buccaneers home games (preseason and regular season) have been blacked out on local television because the games failed to sell out prior to 72 hours before kickoff. The affiliates affected include WTVT, WTSP, and WFLA (preseason) in the Tampa/St. Pete market, as well as WOFL, WKMG and WFTV (preseason) in the Orlando market. Despite their improvement and being in the playoff hunt, Tampa Bay Buccaneers became the first NFL team of the 2010 season to not sell out a single home game.

The Week 1 blackout against Cleveland marked the first regular season game at Raymond James Stadium that failed to sell out. The last TV blackout occurred in 1997.

External links
 Buccaneers.com – Official site
 Pewter Report
 BUCPOWER

References

Tampa Bay Buccaneers season
Tampa Bay Buccaneers
21st century in Tampa, Florida
Tampa Bay Buccaneers seasons